Trinity Cathedral is an Episcopal cathedral located in Easton, Maryland, United States. It is the seat of the Diocese of Easton.  In 1980 it was included as a contributing property in the Easton Historic District, which is listed on the National Register of Historic Places.

History
The Rt. Rev. Henry Champlin Lay, the first Bishop of Easton, desired a cathedral for his young diocese.  The original plans called for a complex of buildings that included a church, diocesan offices, a library, and a Bishop's residence.  The buildings were designed to be grouped around a courtyard similar to a traditional English cathedral.  Construction on the church was begun in 1891.  The granite for the exterior was said to have been shipped by water from Port Deposit, Maryland.  While not completed, the first services were held the following year.  Except for the spire, the church building was completed in 1894.  It was consecrated on May 25 of that year and was put into service as the diocesan cathedral.  The stained glass windows date from 1891 to 1979 and reflect the different styles over that time period.  The spire on the tower was completed in 1978.  The bell that hangs in the tower was cast in the Philippines.   It originally hung in the Chapel of the Epiphany in Preston, Maryland.

See also
George A. Taylor (bishop)

References

Religious organizations established in 1891
Churches completed in 1894
19th-century Episcopal church buildings
Gothic Revival church buildings in Maryland
Episcopal church buildings in Maryland
Cathedrals in Maryland
Episcopal cathedrals in Maryland
Easton, Maryland
Historic district contributing properties in Maryland
Churches on the National Register of Historic Places in Maryland
National Register of Historic Places in Talbot County, Maryland